The Treasury Gardens consist of  on the south-eastern side of the Melbourne central business district, East Melbourne, Victoria, Australia. The gardens are bounded by Wellington Parade, Spring Street, Treasury Place, and by the Fitzroy Gardens across Lansdowne street to the west. They form part of a network of city gardens including Fitzroy Gardens, Carlton Gardens, Flagstaff Gardens and Kings Domain. The gardens are listed on the Victorian Heritage Register for their historical, archaeological, social, "aesthetic and scientific (horticultural) importance for its outstanding nineteenth century design, path layout and planting".

Description
The Gardens are a short walk from Victoria’s Parliament House and are overlooked by the Old Treasury Building and State Offices. They create a landscaped setting for office workers to enjoy during lunch with large areas of lawn and walking paths lined with mature trees. Due to their central location in the city, they are a popular spot as the starting or ending point for political rallies, demonstrations and festivals. The gardens are also enjoyed by business people and tourists staying at the Hilton Hotel on Wellington Parade, who are able to wander through on their way to the business district.

The Victorian heritage listing says "Fitzroy is unique in comparison for its scale and uninterrupted landscape. There are some horticultural similarities between Fitzroy and the Treasury Garden, attributed to the initial work of Clement Hodgkinson, however Fitzroy Gardens is unique due to the layering of history and mosaic of different landscaping styles. The avenues of mature elms and Moreton Bay fig are some of the best tree lined avenues in Victoria".

Mature tree species include Moreton Bay fig (Ficus macrophylla), deodar cedar (Cedrus deodara), English elm (Ulmus procera), white poplar (Populus alba), Dutch elm (Ulmus x hollandica), Dutch elm (small-leaved form), Port Jackson fig (Ficus rubiginosa), Platanus × acerifolia, pedunculate oak (Quercus robur), Agonis flexuosa, Phoenix canariensis, Washingtonia robusta, Butia capitata, Chamaerops humilis, river red gum (Eucalyptus camaldulensis), Norfolk Island pine (Araucaria heterophylla), Brachychiton x roseus, and grevillea (Grevillea hilliana). Along the embankment of Treasury Place there are hydrangeas, ivy and flax. The gardens are highly populated with native common brushtail possums that are popular with visitors at night. Other nocturnal native animals include grey-headed flying foxes and insect eating bats. Pacific black ducks, red wattle birds, and silver gulls also are frequently seen.

The gardens contain an ornamental pond and a number of memorials:{

 Sir William John Clarke Memorial. Marble bust, circa 1902, located by the Treasury building. Erected by public subscription and unveiled by the Governor of Victoria on 22 July 1902.
 Robert Burns Memorial. Bronze replica sculpture by G.A. Lawson of an original erected in the poet's birthplace of Alloway in Scotland. Commissioned by the Caledonian Society in Melbourne, and first erected on St Kilda Road in 1904, and moved to the Treasury Gardens in 1970 due to roadworks.
 President John F. Kennedy Memorial. Bronze bas-relief by sculptor Raymond B. Ewers. Erected in 1965 and located beside the specially landscaped pond and water fountain.

Timeline

 1850s - The area of the gardens was left as open space after failure to sell allotments due to the swampy nature of the land.
 1867 - Clement Hodgkinson designed the Gardens as a pattern of diagonally crossing paths lined with trees. Willow trees were planted around an ornamental pond.
 1902 - William Guilfoyle, director of the Royal Botanic Gardens, Melbourne transforms the ornamental pond into a Japanese Garden. This garden is demolished after the Second World War.
 1929 - management of the Gardens was transferred to the City of Melbourne.
 1934 - Treasury Gardens was used by the community to celebrate Victoria’s centenary.
 1939 - Toilet block built for the Spring Carnival and floral festival. Acknowledged as being of architectural importance for its uncommon art deco design, decorative pattern brick and tile construction and extensive use of wrought iron detailing, including grills, gates, lamps, signs and brick planter, exhibiting outstanding craftsmanship.
 1965 - Monument was erected to the American president, John F Kennedy.
 1996 - Fitzroy and Treasury Gardens Master Plan was adopted by Council.
 2019 - Approximately 150,000 people gathered in the Treasury Gardens for the 20th of September Global Climate Strike.

Events

The Share the Spirit Festival, created by Songlines Aboriginal Music in 2003, is held on Australia Day (26 January) each year. It features a wide variety of music by Indigenous Australian musicians, and is supported by the City of Melbourne, the Department of Justice, Creative Victoria, and other partners.

References

External links
Melbourne City Council - Treasury Gardens
Disability information

Parks in Melbourne
Gardens in Victoria (Australia)
Melbourne City Centre
Heritage sites in Melbourne
East Melbourne, Victoria
Landmarks in Melbourne